Dorin Park Special School is a school for children with a statement for complex special needs. Aged between 2 and 19 years of age, based in Upton-by-Chester, Cheshire. It has specialist SEN status. The school was opened in 1977. In September 2008, building work culminated on a new Community Resource Centre, which was later officially opened in 2010 by Everton FC captain Phil Neville. In 2014 the EYFS department was completely refurbished to enable the school to host two EYFS groups.

References

External links
 Dorin Park School

Special schools in Cheshire West and Chester
Community schools in Cheshire West and Chester
Educational institutions established in 1977
Specialist SEN colleges in England